Tremor and Other Hyperkinetic Movements is a peer-reviewed open access medical journal covering neurology with a focus on hyperkinetic movement disorders including tremor, emphasizing non-Parkinsonian disorders. The journal is published by Ubiquity Press and was established in 2011 by the current editor-in-chief, Elan Louis (University of Texas Southwestern Medical Center).

Abstracting and indexing
The journal is abstracted and indexed in Embase, Emerging Sources Citation Index, and Index Medicus/MEDLINE/PubMed.

References

External links

Publications established in 2011
Neurology journals
English-language journals
Ubiquity Press academic journals
Continuous journals
Creative Commons Attribution-licensed journals